David Philip Benedict Smith (born 25 March 1970) is an Australian politician. On 23 May 2018, the High Court of Australia declared him elected as a Senator for the Australian Capital Territory after Labor senator Katy Gallagher was found ineligible to have been elected. Before his election, Smith was the ACT director of the Professionals Australia union. He was sworn in to the Australian Senate on 18 June 2018. He was elected to the lower-house seat of Bean at the 2019 federal election.

Early years and education
Smith was born in Canberra, Australian Capital Territory. He completed his schooling at Marist College Canberra, and graduated with a Bachelor of Arts with Honours from the Australian National University in 1993.

Public service and trade union
Before joining the Australian Senate, Smith served in various roles including as an advisor in the Department of Employment and Workplace Relations, as an industrial relations manager for the Australian Federal Police Association, and as a policy advisor in the Australian Capital Territory Chief Minister's Department under Jon Stanhope. In 2007, he took up the role of Director of the ACT branch of Professionals Australia, a union which primarily focuses on technical workers such as scientists, engineers, architects, IT professionals, pharmacists, and others.

Political career

Smith has been a member of the Australian Labor Party since 1992. He ran for the Senate in 2004, and was the second candidate on the ALP's 2016 Senate ticket. At the 2016 ACT Labor Annual Conference he was elected Senior Vice-President of the ACT Branch of the Australian Labor Party. He says that he was inspired to serve in politics by the judge and attorney general, Terry Connolly.

On 23 May 2018, the High Court of Australia declared him elected as a Senator for the Australian Capital Territory after Labor senator Katy Gallagher was found ineligible to have been elected. He was sworn in on 18 June 2018.

On 1 September 2018, Smith was preselected to run for the Australian Labor Party in the House of Representatives seat of Bean. He resigned from the Senate on 11 April 2019, the day the election was called and the Senate prorogued.

At the 2019 Australian federal election, Smith was elected as the Member for Bean with a margin of 13,971 votes. He was returned to Parliament in the 2022 Australian federal election, now to the Government benches, keeping a substantial margin, winning 62.9% in the two-party preferred count. He is the Government Whip in the lower house for the Albanese government. He also serves on the Standing Committee for Selection and co-chairs the Parliamentary Christian Fellowship with Senator Matt O'Sullivan.

Personal life
Having been educated in a Marist Brothers college, Smith identifies as a Catholic Christian. He is married to Liesl Centenera. Together, they have three children: Marcus, Eamonn, and Stella.

References

1970 births
Living people
Members of the Australian Senate for the Australian Capital Territory
Australian Labor Party members of the Parliament of Australia
Labor Right politicians
Australian trade unionists
Australian public servants
Members of the Australian House of Representatives
Members of the Australian House of Representatives for Bean